The village of Pamdenec was a small bedroom community located on the Saint John River,  north of Grand Bay, in Westfield Parish, Kings County, New Brunswick, Canada. Pamdenec had a post office from 1924 to 1968, was incorporated as a village in 1966, and became part of  the village of Grand Bay in 1972.

"Pamdenec" is a Maliseet name, meaning "little hill". The village was formerly called Hillside and in 1866, under that name, was a farming community consisting of approximately 75 families.

In 2011, the area was listed on the Canadian Register of Historic Places for its cultural value as the site of a group of summer cottages owned by members of the Jewish community of Saint John, mainly from the 1920s to the 1960s.

References

Neighbourhoods in New Brunswick
Former municipalities in New Brunswick
Populated places disestablished in 1972
Maliseet